The Cupra Formentor is a compact crossover SUV (C-segment) manufactured by the Spanish car manufacturer SEAT under their Cupra performance-oriented sub-brand. Marketed as a coupé SUV, it is the first car designed specifically for the sub-brand. The production version was revealed in March 2020, after its unveiling was postponed when the COVID-19 pandemic led to the cancellation of the 2020 Geneva Motor Show. It was previewed as a near-production concept vehicle at the 2019 Geneva Motor Show. It is named after the Formentor peninsula on the Spanish island of Majorca. Production of the Formentor started in late September 2020.

Specification
The Formentor is available with a  1.4-litre plug-in hybrid, a 2.0-litre turbo generating  available for VZ models (derived from the Spanish word veloz, meaning "fast"), and a range-topping VZ5 model with 2.5-litre turbo generating . All versions come with a 7-speed DSG transmission.

Sales

References

External links

 Official website

Formentor
Cars introduced in 2020
Crossover sport utility vehicles
Front-wheel-drive vehicles
All-wheel-drive vehicles
Cars of Spain
Plug-in hybrid vehicles